3DS refers to the Nintendo 3DS, a handheld video game console that is a successor to the Nintendo DS.

3ds or 3DS may also refer to:
 Autodesk 3ds Max, a 3D graphics application by Autodesk
.3ds, the file extension used by 3ds Max
 Dassault Systèmes or 3DS, a 3D software company
 The 3Ds, an alternative pop/rock band from Dunedin, New Zealand
 Three Ds of antisemitism
 Dirty, dangerous and demeaning or 3Ds, an American neologism derived from a Japanese expression that refers to certain undesirable yet necessary jobs
 3-D Secure, a security protocol for online card transactions
 3DS (die stacking), a computer memory technology
 Terceira Divisão, abbreviated to 3DS, a football league in Portugal

See also 
 3D (disambiguation)
 DS3 (disambiguation)
 DDDS